The Crown of Thorns (puzzle work) is a woodworking technique of tramp art using interlocking wooden pieces that are notched to intersect at right angles forming joints and self-supporting objects, objects that have a "prickly" and transparent quality.  Common examples include wreath-shaped picture frames that look similar to Jesus' "crown of thorns".  

Larger-scale crowns may use the principles of tensegrity structures, where the wooden sticks provide rigidity and separate cables in tension carry the forces that hold them together.

See also
Burr puzzle - similar structures meant as puzzles to assemble
sailor work
interlocking woodwork

References

External links
 Whittled Whimseys website with information about making a crown-of-thorns wreaths.

Joinery
Woodworking